"Tired" is a song by American rock band Stone Sour, released on August 14, 2013 as the second single from their fourth album House of Gold & Bones – Part 1. The song reached No. 1 on the Billboard Mainstream Rock chart.

Music video 
The music video was released through their official YouTube channel on August 19, 2013.

Track listing

Chart positions

References

Stone Sour songs
2013 singles
2013 songs
Roadrunner Records singles
Songs written by Roy Mayorga
Songs written by Josh Rand
Songs written by Jim Root
Song recordings produced by David Bottrill
Songs written by Corey Taylor